Gianfranco Ferrero (born 6 June 1995) is an Argentine professional footballer who plays as an attacking midfielder for Central Norte.

Career
Ferrero began in Primera División side Atlético de Rafaela's youth teams, before being promoted into the club's first-team in 2016 and subsequently making his debut on 29 November in a Primera División game versus San Martín; Rafaela won 0–3 with Ferrero assisting the third goal. Three more appearances followed, prior to Rafaela suffering relegation to Primera B Nacional. After seventeen appearances in the following two seasons, Ferrero departed to Portugal with AD Oliveirense in June 2019. He scored on debut against AR São Martinho on 25 August, with another goal coming a month later versus Maria da Fonte.

September 2020 saw Ferrero return to his homeland with Torneo Federal A side Central Norte.

Career statistics
.

References

External links

1995 births
Living people
Sportspeople from Córdoba Province, Argentina
Argentine footballers
Association football midfielders
Argentine expatriate footballers
Expatriate footballers in Portugal
Argentine expatriate sportspeople in Portugal
Argentine Primera División players
Campeonato de Portugal (league) players
Primera Nacional players
Torneo Federal A players
Atlético de Rafaela footballers
AD Oliveirense players
Central Norte players